Zatrephes duraneli is a moth of the family Erebidae. It was described by Hervé de Toulgoët in 1991. It is found in French Guiana.

References

Phaegopterina
Moths described in 1991